Zodarion thoni is a spider species found in Eastern Europe to Azerbaijan.

See also 
 List of Zodariidae species

References

External links 

thoni
Spiders of Europe
Spiders of Asia
Fauna of Azerbaijan
Spiders described in 1905